Michele Sepe (born 8 October 1986) is an Italian rugby union player. Sepe, who is a wing, plays club rugby for Fiamme Oro Rugby. He made his debut for Italy against Japan on 11 June 2006.

Biography
Sepe began his career at Lazio, with whom he made his debut during the 2004–05 season. He subsequently moved to Capitolina of the Super 10 (now Top12) in 2005. He moved to Viadana in the summer of 2009. He spent one year at Viadana before moving to Benetton Treviso in June 2010.

References

1986 births
Living people
Sportspeople from Rome
Italian rugby union players
Rugby union wings
Benetton Rugby players
Italy international rugby union players
Fiamme Oro Rugby players